The Indianapolis mayoral election of 1995 took place on November 7, 1995. Incumbent Republican mayor Stephen Goldsmith was reelected.

Election results

References

1995
1995 United States mayoral elections
1995 Indiana elections